The acronym UIPI may refer to
 User Interface Privilege Isolation, a computer technology
 Union Internationale de la Propriété Immobilière, a European association of real estate owners